As It Is is an album by drummer Peter Erskine featuring pianist John Taylor and bassist Palle Danielsson recorded in 1995 and released on the ECM label.

Reception

AllMusic critic, Scott Yanow, said "Although led by a drummer, this trio session mostly showcases English pianist John Taylor who is heavily influenced by Keith Jarrett".

Track listing
All compositions by John Taylor except where noted.
 "Glebe Ascending" - 7:01 
 "The Lady in the Lake" (Peter Erskine) - 8:00 
 "Episode" - 4:30 
 "Woodcocks" - 7:15 
 "Esperança" (Vince Mendoza) - 3:58 
 "Touch Her Soft Lips and Part" (William Walton) - 4:54 
 "Au Contraire" - 10:18 
 "For Ruth" - 6:44 
 "Romeo & Juliet" (Erskine) - 4:29
Recorded at Rainbow Studio in Oslo, Norway in September 1995

Personnel
Peter Erskine — drums
John Taylor — piano 
Palle Danielsson — bass

References

ECM Records albums
Peter Erskine albums
1996 albums
Albums produced by Manfred Eicher